Cambodian vehicle license plates are the license plates attached to most motorized road vehicles in Cambodia, which are required by law. Cambodian license plates display the name of the province where the vehicle was registered. The owner must register the car in the province they live; this can be a different province from where the owner has his official residence (as shown in the housing register). If the title to the car is transferred to someone else, and the new owner lives in a different province, the number usually changes.

Types

Common types
The current Cambodian vehicle license plate format, used since April 1, 2004, has one class number, one or two letters of Latin alphabet, four numbers (from 0001 to 9999) and the name of the province in Khmer in which the car was registered at the top and at the bottom in English. (Ex.  2D-0008 RATANAKIRI;  2D-0088 PREAH SIHANOUK;  2D-0888 PHNOM PENH;  2D-8888 BANTEAY MEANCHEY).

* Most 4-door pickups are included in this type.
** Usually a van or a lorry with more than seven seats.

There are plans to add another letter after the license plate numbers of Phnom Penh are full. For example, it starts from "1 AA 0001" to "1 AA 9999", then starts at "1 AB 0001", and continues again. In Phnom Penh, the motorcycle plate already started in 2012.

Personalised number plates

In June 2019, a sub-decree was announced allowing car owners to transfer registration plates to new vehicles, and purchase customised number plates for a premium fee.

Personalised plates are obtained via an online portal where vehicle owners search for existing plates for sale, or create a plate. Prices for customised plates can reach up to 1,000,000,000KHR (approximately USD250,000).

Custom plates feature the word កម្ពុជា "Kampuchea" and can contain up to 9 alpha-numeric characters.

The program has become a highly lucrative source of revenue for the Ministry of Public Works and Transport, raising more than US$70M net through sales of personalised number plates from 2019 to February 2022

International Organisations & Non Government Organisations

NGOs and international organisations can be issued plates signifying their organisational status. Plates are light blue with white text, with the designation ONG or OI in capital letters, representing the French spelling, Organisation Non Gouvernementale and Organisation Internationale.

Police

Cars owned by the police get the red plate with "" as the province of registration.

Embassy and consulate

Embassy and consulate vehicles have their own license plates with a yellow background and blue text.

Royal vehicles
The royal family's license plate has two yellow letters in Khmer script and three yellow numbers on a blue plate.

Temporary plates 
Until 1993, new cars not yet getting the real plate get the five-digit number plate.

When people use registered cars temporarily outside Cambodia, they may have English temporary plates. The English plates are the same number as the real plates and used for that car only. The plate has the province name in English at the bottom, instead of in Khmer. Today this is used for every car.

State Plates
Government vehicles use state plates which include the word State,() and numerical designation for the administrative body responsible.

Location names
Cambodian license plates use the Khmer name of the province where its owner (a person or company) is located or registered.

References

External links
 http://www.mpwt.gov.kh/
 https://vehicle.mpwt.gov.kh/

Cambodia
Transport in Cambodia
Cambodia transport-related lists